The 1974 World Championship Tennis Finals was a men's tennis tournament played on indoor carpet courts. It was the 4th edition of the WCT Finals and was part of the 1974 World Championship Tennis circuit. The tournament was played at the Moody Coliseum in Dallas, Texas in the United States and was held from May 8 through May 12, 1974. John Newcombe won the singles title.

Finals

Singles

 John Newcombe defeated  Björn Borg 4–6, 6–3, 6–3, 6–2 
 It was Newcombe's 8th title of the year and the 56th of his career.

References

 

 
World Championship Tennis Finals
World Championship Tennis Finals
World Championship Tennis Finals
WCT Finals